These are the official results of the women's 800 metres event at the 1992 Summer Olympics in Barcelona, Spain. There were a total of 36 participating athletes, with five qualifying heats.

Race description
Favorites for the title were 1991 Tokyo World Championships gold medallist Liliya Nurutdinova for the Unified Team, Ana Quirot (Cuba), and Africa's hopeful, 19-year old Maria Mutola (Mozambique). Other potential rivals like the former East German athletes Sigrun Wodars (as Sigrun Grau, after a divorce) and Christine Wachtel, the one-two finish at the 1988 Summer Olympics in Seoul, had been eliminated in the preliminaries. The fastest semi-final was won by Nurutdinova. Dutch runner Ellen van Langen had set the fastest time of the season prior to the Games.

In the final, fearing Van Langen's final sprint, her main competitor, a confident Nurutdinova, set a rapid pace, running the first lap in a very fast time of 55.73, with Van Langen only in 6th position. Pressured by Mutola, Quirot and Ella Kovacs (Romania), Nurutdinova led the final from the start. Entering the final stretch she had a slight lead, but Van Langen, only fifth at 600 meters, moved through on the inside. With Nurutdinova moving away from the curb to block her challengers, Van Langen in the last 50m passed – still on the inside – to win a surprise victory in a time of 1:55.54, beating Nurutdinova (silver) and Quirot (bronze).

Van Langen later explained the secret of her success. “I think what I could do well is I could die very well in a race and still continue,” she said. “That is very hard, because it hurts running the 800 meters. You have to overcome some boundaries in yourself to continue when it hurts like hell. I was good at it. If the Olympic race would have been run by each athlete individual and the fastest time was the winner I would not have won,” she added. “I was also good in tactics, looking around me and taking the right decisions.”

Medalists

Records
These were the standing world and Olympic records (in minutes) prior to the 1992 Summer Olympics.

Final

Semi finals

Heats

See also
 1988 Women's Olympic 800 metres (Seoul)
 1990 Women's European Championships 800 metres (Split)
 1991 Women's World Championships 800 metres (Tokyo)
 1993 Women's World Championships 800 metres (Stuttgart)
 1994 Women's European Championships 800 metres (Helsinki)
 1995 Women's World Championships 800 metres (Gothenburg)
 1996 Women's Olympic 800 metres (Atlanta)

References

External links
 Official Report
 Results

 
800 metres at the Olympics
1992 in women's athletics
Women's events at the 1992 Summer Olympics